Angela Fick Braly (born July 2, 1961, in Dallas, Texas) is an American executive. She served as president and chief executive officer of WellPoint (now Anthem), a large U.S.-based provider of health insurance, and was a member of the company's board of directors. She assumed those responsibilities on June 1, 2007, following several high-profile roles for the company. She resigned in August 2012 due to shareholder criticism. Since May 2016, she has been a member of the board of directors of ExxonMobil.

Early life
Angela Braly received her undergraduate degree from Texas Tech University in 1982 and her Juris Doctor from Southern Methodist University School of Law. She graduated from Richardson High School in 1979.

Career
She was a partner in the St. Louis law firm of Lewis, Rice & Fingersh, L.C.

In January 1999, she joined WellPoint as general counsel for RightCHOICE (currently Anthem Blue Cross and Blue Shield in Missouri). She also oversaw the Missouri plan's government relations efforts. During that time, she managed the legal strategy resulting in the creation of The Missouri Foundation for Health, which serves the health care needs of underinsured and uninsured people in Missouri. She later became president and CEO of the Missouri plan, managing all aspects of the business and setting strategies to meet customer needs.

She served as executive vice president, general counsel and chief public affairs officer for WellPoint. In that role, she was responsible for public policy development, government relations, legal affairs, corporate communications, marketing, and social responsibility initiatives. She also had operational responsibility for the nation's largest Medicare claims processing business and the federal employee health benefits business. Braly was also a key strategist during WellPoint's acquisition of New-York based WellChoice in 2005.

On February 24, 2010, Braly gave testimony to Congress defending Wellpoint's insurance premium increases. She served as vice-chairman of the executive committee of The Business Council for 2011 and 2012.

She was recognized by the St. Louis Business Journal as one of the 25 Most Influential Women in Business for 2000 and was named one of Modern Healthcare's Top 25 Women in Healthcare in 2007. Forbes listed Braly as the sixteenth most powerful woman in the world in 2007, fourth most powerful in 2008, and eighth most powerful in 2009. Fortune ranked Braly the fourth most powerful woman in business in America in 2007, fifth most powerful in 2008., and fourth most powerful in 2009.

In May 2013, Braly was named by Indiana Governor Mike Pence to the board of the Indiana Economic Development Corporation.

Personal life
As of April 2009, Braly had the 306th highest compensation for a U.S. CEO, having earned $4.07 million, which is 74th among females. She owns $4.6 million worth of WellPoint stock, or 0.02% of the company.

In 2007, Braly earned $14.9 million, mostly in stock options. Her total compensation was $8.7 million in 2008, and $13.1 million in 2009.

Braly generally supports Republican and conservative political candidates.

References

External links
WellPoint biography

Interview with Braly
Forbes profile

Living people
American women chief executives
American women lawyers
American lawyers
1961 births
Rawls College of Business alumni
Women business executives
Southern Methodist University alumni
People from Richardson, Texas
Texas Tech University alumni
American health care chief executives
American corporate directors
Women corporate directors
Directors of ExxonMobil